Abu kabir is a city in the Sharqia Governorate of Egypt.

Successive census results indicate a considerable steady rise in its population - 68,394  in 1986,  85,340 in 1996,  102,603 in and 106,050 (estimated) in 2008.

Abu Kebir is a city located in Al Sharkia Governorate in the north of Egypt, 80km from Cairo capital. Among its figures are chemist Mostafa El-Sayed and football player Ahmed Salama.

It is well known for its rural suburbs with some distinctive agricultural crops as well as the urban area and markets in the city center.

Climate
Köppen-Geiger climate classification system classifies its climate as hot desert (BWh).

References

Populated places in Sharqia Governorate
Cities in Egypt

Governorate capitals in Egypt